Knibb is a surname. Notable people with the surname include:

John Knibb (1650–1722), English clockmaker
Kellion Knibb (born 1993), Jamaican athlete
Lloyd Knibb (1931–2011), Jamaican drummer
William Knibb (1803–1845), English Baptist minister and missionary to Jamaica

See also
Knabb